The Squatter's Daughter is a 1924 painting by Australian artist George Washington Lambert. It is part of the collection of the National Gallery of Australia in Canberra.

Subject
The painting depicts Gwendoline ‘Dee’ Ryrie, the "squatter's daughter" wearing a white shirt and jodhpurs standing by her horse in her family's farming property at Michelago, in New South Wales, Australia. Lambert had met Ryrie's father Major General Sir Granville Ryrie during World War I in Palestine while working as an official war artist. The horse itself was a gift to Gwendoline from Lambert.

Composition
In this painting Lambert set out to take a more formal approach to the Australian landscape, looking to reduce the landscape to definite forms.

Lambert described his portrayal of Ryrie as "like a figure on a Greek vase" passing "gracefully across the foreground".

Provenance
Lambert sold the painting in 1926 to Englishman George Pitt-Rivers. The painting was acquired by the National Gallery of Australia in 1991 with the assistance of James Fairfax and Philip Bacon and the people of Australia.

Reception

The first exhibition of The Squatter's Daughter "created a stir" with its formalist approach to the Australian landscape. Howard Ashton was critical of the painting claiming that it lacked emotion. Another critic commented: "The Lambert landscape, The Squatter’s Daughter, will be of unique interest … as representing a direct break with the Streeton convention" while Hans Heysen remarked that the painting was "different from anything else painted in Australia" and later that it was "an object lesson for the young landscape painters of Australia".

References

External links
The Squatter's Daughter - National Gallery of Australia collection.

Paintings by George Washington Lambert
Collections of the National Gallery of Australia
1924 paintings
Horses in art